Darius I of Media Atropatene, also known as Darius I or Darius (ca. 85 BC – ca. 65 BC), was an Iranian prince who served as a king of Media Atropatene in c. 65 BC. Little is known of the life of Darius I, however he appeared to have succeeded his relative, Mithridates, who served as King of Media Atropatene one year earlier.

Darius I was known during his kingship to have been attacked by the Roman general Pompey with his army. However, the circumstances that led Pompey to attack Media Atropatene are unknown. Sometime in 65 BC, Darius I appeared to have died. His relative, Ariobarzanes I succeeded him as King of Media Atropatene.

References

Sources
 

60s BC deaths
1st-century BC Iranian monarchs
Rulers of Media Atropatene
Parthian Dark Age